Carazo is a Spanish surname. Notable people with the surname include:

Evaristo Carazo (1821-1889), President of Nicaragua
Juan Carazo (born 1964), Puerto Rican former boxer
Pedro Largo Carazo (born 1972), Spanish football defender
Rodrigo Carazo Odio (1926-2009), President of Costa Rica

Spanish-language surnames